K. gracilis may refer to:
 Kniphofia gracilis, a flowering plant species in the genus Kniphofia
 Korscheltellus gracilis, the conifer swift, a moth species

See also
 Gracilis (disambiguation)